This is a list of schools in the London Borough of Richmond upon Thames, England.

State-funded schools

Primary schools

Archdeacon Cambridge's CE Primary School
Barnes Primary School
Bishop Perrin CE Primary School
Buckingham Primary School
Carlisle Infant School
Chase Bridge Primary School
Collis Primary School
Darell Primary School
Deer Park School
East Sheen Primary School
Hampton Hill Junior School
Hampton Infant School
Hampton Junior School
Hampton Wick Infant School
Heathfield Infant School
Heathfield Junior School
Holy Trinity CE Primary School
Kew Riverside Primary School
Lowther Primary School
Marshgate Primary School
Meadlands Primary School
Nelson Primary School
Orleans Primary School
The Queen's CE Primary School
The Russell Primary School
Sacred Heart RC Primary School
St Edmund's RC Primary School
St Elizabeth's RC Primary School
St James's RC Primary School
St John the Baptist CE Junior School
St Mary Magdalen's RC Primary School
St Mary's & St Peter's CE Primary School
St Mary's CE Primary School
St Mary's Hampton CE Primary School
St Osmund's RC Primary School
St Richard Reynolds RC College
St Richard's CE Primary School
St Stephen's CE Primary School
Sheen Mount Primary School
Stanley Primary School
Thomson House School
Trafalgar Infant School
Trafalgar Junior School
Twickenham Primary Academy
The Vineyard School

Secondary schools

Christ's School, Richmond
Grey Court School, Ham
Hampton High, Hampton
Orleans Park School, Twickenham
Richmond Park Academy, East Sheen
Richmond upon Thames School, Twickenham
St Richard Reynolds Catholic College, Twickenham
Teddington School, Teddington
Turing House School, Teddington
Twickenham School, Whitton
Waldegrave School, Twickenham

Special and alternative schools
Capella House School
Clarendon School
Strathmore School

Further education
 Richmond and Hillcroft Adult Community College
 Richmond upon Thames College

Independent schools

Primary and preparatory schools

 Broomfield House School, Kew
 Falcons Prep, Richmond
 Jack and Jill School, Hampton 
 Kew College, Kew
 Kew Green Preparatory School, Kew
 King's House School, Richmond
 The Mall School, Twickenham
 Newland House School, Twickenham
 The Old Vicarage School, Richmond Hill
 St Paul's Juniors, Barnes
 Tower House School, East Sheen
 Twickenham Preparatory School, Twickenham
 Unicorn School, Kew

Senior and all-through schools

 German School London, Petersham
 Hampton Court House, East Molesey
 Hampton School, Hampton
 The Harrodian School, Barnes
 Lady Eleanor Holles School, Hampton
 Radnor House School, Twickenham
 Royal Ballet School, Richmond Park
 St Catherine's School, Twickenham
 St Paul's School, Barnes
 The Swedish School in London, Barnes and (for sixth form studies) Richmond

References

Sources

External links
 State schools in the London Borough of Richmond upon Thames

Richmond upon Thames